The Wild Ones is a 2012 Spanish drama film directed by Patrícia Ferreira.

The film premiered at the 2012 Málaga Film Festival where it won Best Picture. The film was nominated for three Goya Awards (Best New Actor, Best New Actress and Best Original Song).

Plot
Álex, Gabi and Oki, three teenagers who live in a big city, are completely unknown for their parents, for their teachers and for themselves. Their emotional isolation, taken to the limit have unexpected and dire consequences that will shake the society.

Cast 
 Marina Comas - Oki
 Àlex Monner - Àlex
 Albert Baró - Gabi
 Aina Clotet - Júlia
 Ana Fernández - Rosa
 José Luis García Pérez - Luis
 Montse Germán - Elisa
 Francesc Orella - Àngel
  - Raquel
  - Laura
 Emma Vilarasau - Dir. institut
  - Jesús
  - Antonio
 Mercè Pons - Interrogadora

Accolades

References

2012 films
2012 drama films
Spanish drama films
2010s Catalan-language films
2010s Spanish-language films
Áralan Films films
2010s Spanish films